In probability theory, the slash distribution is the probability distribution of a standard normal variate divided by an independent standard uniform variate. In other words, if the random variable Z has a normal distribution with zero mean and unit variance, the random variable U has a uniform distribution on [0,1] and Z and U are statistically independent, then the random variable X = Z / U has a slash distribution. The slash distribution is an example of a ratio distribution. The distribution was named by William H. Rogers and John Tukey in a paper published in 1972.

The probability density function (pdf) is

where  is the probability density function of the standard normal distribution.  The quotient is undefined at x = 0, but the discontinuity is removable:

 

The most common use of the slash distribution is in simulation studies. It is a useful distribution in this context because it has heavier tails than a normal distribution, but it is not as pathological as the Cauchy distribution.

References

Continuous distributions
Normal distribution
Compound probability distributions
Probability distributions with non-finite variance